The British Catholic Stage Guild, the main organisation for Roman Catholics in British entertainment, was founded in 1911. The aim of the Guild, as laid out in the 1931 Year Book, was "to establish and encourage spiritual, artistic and social intercourse among [Roman] Catholics connected with the theatrical and allied professions". The Guild is now known as the Catholic Association of Performing Arts (CaAPA). The Guild is closely associated with Corpus Christi Church, Maiden Lane in London’s Covent Garden area.

Its current details include: 
Address: Corpus Christi Church, #1 Maiden Lane, London, UK, WC2E 7NB 
Registered charity number: 267957
Chair: Frank Comerford 
CaAPA National Chaplain: Fr Alan Robinson
CaAPA Chairman of Trustees: Monsignor Vladimir Felzmann 

Current membership includes such noted performers as Valerie Masterson and Simon Callow, as well as numerous less well-known performers, such as actor Martin O'Brien, who co-founded ACTS (Association of Catholics in Theatre and on Screen) in 2005, and is the current Artistic Director of the CaAPA-affiliated Ten Ten Theatre. 

Deceased former members of the Guild include actors Sir Alec Guinness (a former Vice-President of the Guild), Patricia Hayes (who was a former Chair of the Guild, as was her son, actor Richard O'Callaghan), Danny La Rue, Michael Williams (a former Chair), Margaretta Scott, Moira Lister, Eamonn Andrews (a former Chair), Lionel Jeffries (a former Chair) and Frank Finlay. Guinness and Jeffries were both converts. Member Vince Powell was a noted television writer and producer. Last of the Summer Wine star Joe Gladwin was Northern representative before his death.

Activities
Activities of the Guild since then have been numerous and varied, including links with other denominations in services and carols, play readings, Students' Evenings, AIDS awareness Masses, music halls, recitals, and concerts. 

Past events have included a Memorial Mass for former Vice-President of the Guild, Michael Williams, which was attended by his widow, Dame Judi Dench, and their daughter, actress Finty Williams; a reception at the Garrick Club for Cardinal Cormac Murphy-O'Connor, which was hosted by Frank Finlay. Members of the Catholic Stage Guild and the English National Opera provided the entertainment; a fund-raising Quiz Night at Holy Apostles Church, Pimlico and a talk at the CAA, 20 Bedford Street, by Piers Paul Read, the official biographer of the Guild's late Vice-President, Sir Alec Guinness.

References

External links
 CaAPA website (PDF)
 CaAPA productions
 CaAPA membership section
 London Online website

Theatrical organisations in the United Kingdom
1911 establishments in the United Kingdom
Performing groups established in 1911
Christian organizations established in 1911
Religious organisations based in the United Kingdom
Catholic lay organisations
Catholic Church in the United Kingdom